Schull is a city in Ireland.

Schull may also refer to:
 Schull and Skibbereen Railway
 Schull railway station

People with the surname
 Amanda Schull, American professional ballet dancer 
 Belinda Schüll, Mexican singer, songwriter, and actress
 Joseph Schull, Canadian playwright and historian
 Rebecca Schull, American actor
 Richard Schull, American character actor

See also
 Scholl
 Schuller